The You River, also known as the Youjiang River, is a river of Guangxi, China. It rises in eastern Yunnan and joins the Zuo River ("Left River") near Nanning to form the Yong River. These rivers form part of the Pearl River system, which flows into the South China Sea near Guangzhou.

The river lends it name to the language Youjiang Zhuang, the area Youjiang District and to a university Youjiang Medical University for Nationalities. Formerly Baise Bama Airport was known as Baise Youjiang Airport between December 2006 and September 2013.

See also
List of rivers in China

Rivers of Guangxi
Tributaries of the Pearl River (China)